Victor Robert Dican (born 11 October 2000) is a Romanian professional footballer who plays as a defensive midfielder or centre-back for Liga I side FC Botoșani, which he captains.

Club career

FC Botoșani
He made his league debut on 31 January 2022 in Liga I match against CFR Cluj.

References

External links
 
 

2000 births
Living people
Sportspeople from Râmnicu Vâlcea
Romanian emigrants to Spain
Romanian footballers
Association football defenders
FC Universitatea Cluj players
FC Botoșani players
Liga I players
Liga II players
Liga III players
Romania youth international footballers